Ballester Point (‘Nos Ballester’ \'nos ba-'les-ter\) is a point forming the south side of the entrance to Johnsons Dock and the northeast side of the entrance to Española Cove in Hurd Peninsula, Livingston Island in the South Shetland Islands, Antarctica.  The area was visited by early 19th century sealers operating from Johnsons Dock.

The feature is named for Antonio Ballester, a doyen of the Spanish Antarctic Program.

Location
(British mapping in 1822 and 1968, detailed Spanish mapping in 1991, Bulgarian mapping in 1996, 2005 and 2009).

Maps
 Isla Livingston: Península Hurd. Mapa topográfico de escala 1:25000. Madrid: Servicio Geográfico del Ejército, 1991. (Map reproduced on p. 16 of the linked work)
 L.L. Ivanov. Livingston Island: Central-Eastern Region. Scale 1:25000 topographic map.  Sofia: Antarctic Place-names Commission of Bulgaria, 1996.
 L.L. Ivanov et al., Antarctica: Livingston Island and Greenwich Island, South Shetland Islands (from English Strait to Morton Strait, with illustrations and ice-cover distribution), Scale 1: 100000 map, Antarctic Place-names Commission of Bulgaria, Ministry of Foreign Affairs, Sofia, 2005.
 L.L. Ivanov. Antarctica: Livingston Island and Greenwich, Robert, Snow and Smith Islands. Scale 1:120000 topographic map.  Troyan: Manfred Wörner Foundation, 2009.
 Antarctic Digital Database (ADD). Scale 1:250000 topographic map of Antarctica. Scientific Committee on Antarctic Research (SCAR). Since 1993, regularly upgraded and updated.
 L.L. Ivanov. Antarctica: Livingston Island and Smith Island. Scale 1:100000 topographic map. Manfred Wörner Foundation, 2017.

References
 Ballester Point. SCAR Composite Gazetteer of Antarctica.
 Bulgarian Antarctic Gazetteer. Antarctic Place-names Commission. (details in Bulgarian, basic data in English)

External links
 Ballester Point. Copernix satellite image

Headlands of Livingston Island
Bulgaria and the Antarctic
Spain and the Antarctic